Redd is a masculine given name, and may refer to:

 Redd Boggs (1921–1996), American writer
 Redd Foxx (1922–1991), American actor
 Redd Pepper (born 1961), American voice actor
 Redd Stewart (1923–2003), American songwriter
 Redd Volkaert (born 1958), Canadian musician

See also
 Red (nickname)
 Read (surname)
 Redd (surname)
 Redd (disambiguation)

Masculine given names